Major-General Reginald Peregrine Harding,  (3 July 1905 – 27 December 1981) was a British Army officer.

Military career
After graduating from the Royal Military College, Sandhurst, Harding was commissioned into the 5th/6th Dragoons on 29 January 1925. He was appointed a Companion of the Distinguished Service Order in the 1940 Birthday Honours for his services in the Second World War.

After the war, in October 1946, he became commander of 22nd Armoured Brigade which was re-designated 7th Armoured Brigade in January 1947; he then became Commandant of the Royal Armoured Corps Centre at Bovington Camp in August 1949. He went on to be General Officer Commanding 49th (West Riding) Armoured Division in December 1951 and General Officer Commanding East Anglian District in May 1955 before retiring in June 1958.

He was appointed a Companion of the Order of the Bath in the 1953 Coronation Honours.

In 1933, as an amateur jockey, he won the National Hunt Chase Challenge Cup on a horse known as "Ego" which had been trained by Lieutenant Colonel Morgan Lindsay.

References

|-

1905 births
1981 deaths
British Army major generals
Graduates of the Royal Military College, Sandhurst
Companions of the Order of the Bath
Companions of the Distinguished Service Order
5th Royal Inniskilling Dragoon Guards officers
British Army personnel of World War II